The Mouvement anti-utilitariste dans les sciences sociales (Anti-utilitarian Movement in the Social Sciences) is a French intellectual movement. It is based around the ideology of "anti-utilitarianism", a critique of economism in social sciences and instrumental rationalism in moral and political philosophy. The movement was founded in 1981 by sociologist Alain Caillé, with the establishment of its interdisciplinary monthly journal Revue du MAUSS which is still published and edited by Caillé.

The journal covers topics in economics, anthropology, sociology and political philosophy from an anti-utilitarian perspective. His name is both an acronym and a tribute to the famous anthropologist Marcel Mauss. The movement works to promote a third paradigm, as a complement to, or replacement for holism and methodological individualism.

The movement began through conversations between Caillé and Swiss anthropologist Gerald Berthoud wondering why the economic theory of Marcel Mauss based on obligatory reciprocity and debt did not provide any possibilities of a "free gift" motivated by empathy rather than rational self-interest. The movement's early efforts considered the possibility of reintroducing an aspect of genuine interest in the welfare of others in economic theory. Among the economic policies suggested by the movement is the basic income guarantee a concept originally developed by Thomas Paine.

Some regular contributors to the journal
Paul Jorion
 Paul Ariès
Genevieve Azam
Gerald Berthoud
Alain Caillé
Philippe Chanial
Jacques Dewitte
Mary Douglas
Denis Duclos
Jean-Pierre Dupuy
Michael Freitag
Marcel Gauchet
Philippe d'Iribarne
Stephen Kalberg
Serge Latouche
Louis Maitrier
Jean-Claude Michéa
Thierry Paquot
Lucien Scubla
Camille Tarot
Frederic Vandenberghe
Raoul Vaneigem
Jean-Pierre Voyer

References

Schools of economic thought
Philosophical schools and traditions
Continental philosophy
Great Recession in Europe
Political movements
21st-century social movements
Modern art
Organizations established in 1981
1981 establishments in France
Far-left politics in France
Contemporary French history
Social philosophy